John Michael David Coey (born 24 February 1945), known as Michael Coey, is a Belfast-born experimental physicist working in the fields of magnetism and spintronics.
He got a BA in Physics at Jesus College, Cambridge (1966), and a PhD from University of Manitoba (1971) for
a thesis on "Mössbauer Effect of 57Fe in Magnetic Oxides" with advisor Allan H. Morrish. Trinity College Dublin (TCD), where he has been in the physics department since 1978, awarded him ScD (1987) and the University of Grenoble awarded him Dip. d'Habilitation (1986) and an honorary doctorate (1994). He served as Erasmus Smith's Professor of Natural and Experimental Philosophy at TCD from 2007 to 2012.

Career
Mike Coey has been a Professor of Physics at TCD since 1987, and was the last appointed Erasmus Smith's Professor of Natural and Experimental Philosophy (2007–2012), a chair that dates from 1724. He has supervised over 50 PhD students, and authored or edited 5 volumes. Recognised as a distinguished European specialist in magnetic materials; internationally he continues to be a leader in the field of magnetism.

In 1994 Coey founded Magnetic Solutions and went on to be the cofounder of CRANN Ireland's Nanoscience Research institute (2002) and conceived Dublin's unique Science Gallery (2006). He has published over 700 scientific articles on diverse aspects of magnetism, many of which have had significant impact on the scientific community. As Ireland's most highly cited scientist, with an h-index of 109.

Mike Coey continues to make an impact at both the cutting edge of his chosen areas of specialisation and to the wider scientific community. His recent textbook Magnetism and Magnetic Materials has met the need for a general, tangible text about modern magnetism.

He delivered a public lecture on the History of Magnetism in Paris in 2010. Currently Mike holds positions at National University Singapore and the Max Planck Institute for Chemical Physics of Solids in Dresden. His belief in advancement through collaboration demonstrated through postings as a visiting scientist/professor that include: IBM Yorktown Heights (1979), Institute of Physics Peking (1980), McGill University (1982), University of Bordeaux (1984), CEN-Grenoble (1985), Johns Hopkins APL (1986), Universite de Paris IV (1992), University of California, San Diego  (1997), Florida State University (1998), University of Paris XI (1998), Leman University Geneva (2001/3), University of Strasbourg (2006). Mike Coey pioneered co-operation between academic and industrial laboratories in the groundbreaking Concerted European Action on Magnets (1985–95). Throughout his career he has strongly identified himself with the European spirit and tradition of collaboration.

Honours and awards
Mike Coey is a member of the Royal Irish Academy (1987), a Fellow of the Royal Society (2003) and a Foreign Associate of the US National Academy of Sciences (2005). He is also a fellow of the Institute of Physics, the Mineralogical Society of America and the American Physical Society. His numerous awards include a Fulbright Fellowship, the Charles Chree Medal of the Institute of Physics (1997), the Gold Medal of the Royal Irish Academy (2005) the RDS INTEL Prize Lecture on Nanoscience (2012) in addition to being the recipient of the Humboldt (2013), Gutenberg (2015) and Max Born Medal and Prize (2019) awards. He has an honorary doctorate from the Institute Institute National Polytechnique Grenoble (1994) and has been a Distinguished Lecturer, IEEE Magnetics Study (2006) and the Albert Einstein Professor of the Chinese Academy of Sciences (2010).

Books
 Magnetism and Magnetic Materials (Cambridge University Press, 2010)
 (with R. Skomski) Permanent Magnetism (IOP 1999)
 (with K Moorjani) Magnetic Glasses (Elsevier 1984)
 (edited) Rare Earth Iron Permanent Magnets (Oxford 1996)
 (edited) Concerted European Action on Magnets (Elsevier 1989)
 (edited) Structural and Magnetic Phase Transitions in Minerals (Springer 1988)
 (edited) Current Topics in Magnetism (CJP 1987)

Personal life
Mike has been married to Wong May Coey for 40 years and has two sons, James and Dominic.

References

Sources
 
 
 

1945 births
Living people
Academics of Trinity College Dublin
Alumni of Jesus College, Cambridge
Fellows of the Royal Society
Grenoble Institute of Technology alumni
Irish physicists
Foreign associates of the National Academy of Sciences
Spintronics
20th-century British physicists
21st-century British physicists
University of Manila alumni
Fellows of the American Physical Society